The 2023 Pskov Oblast gubernatorial election will take place on 10 September 2023, on common election day. Incumbent Governor Mikhail Vedernikov is running to a second term in office.

Background
Then-Deputy Presidential Envoy to the Northwestern Federal District Mikhail Vedernikov was appointed acting Governor of Pskov Oblast in October 2017, replacing two-term Governor Andrey Turchak, who resigned to assume the position of United Russia General Council Secretary. Vedernikov won the following gubernatorial election with 70,68% of the vote, facing little opposition.

In October 2022 rumours spread out that Zarina Doguzova, former Head of the recently dissolved Rostourism, could be appointed acting Governor of Pskov Oblast. However, in December 2022 Vedernikov openly declared his intentions to run for a second full term.

Candidates
In Pskov Oblast candidates for Governor can be nominated only by registered political parties, self-nomination is not possible. However, candidates are not obliged to be members of the nominating party. Candidate for Governor of Pskov Oblast should be a Russian citizen and at least 30 years old. Candidates for Governor should not have a foreign citizenship or residence permit. Each candidate in order to be registered is required to collect at least 7% of signatures of members and heads of municipalities. Also gubernatorial candidates present 3 candidacies to the Federation Council and election winner later appoints one of the presented candidates.

Declared
 Mikhail Vedernikov (United Russia), incumbent Governor of Pskov Oblast (2017–present)

Publicly expressed interest
 Igor Romanov (Party of Growth), businessman, perennial candidate, 2018 gubernatorial candidate

Potential
 Aleksandr Bayev (CPRF), Member of Pskov City Duma (2017–present)
 Oleg Bryachak (SR–ZP), Member of Pskov Oblast Assembly of Deputies (2011–present), son of former State Duma member Mikhail Bryachak, 2014 gubernatorial candidate
 Vladislav Davankov (New People), Deputy Chairman of the State Duma (2021—present)
 Mikhail Ivanov (RPPSS), Deputy Chairman of Pskov City Duma (2022–present), former Chairman of Pskov Oblast Electoral Commission (2007–2009, 2017–2019)
 Sergey Leonov (LDPR), Member of State Duma (2021–present)
 Sergey Litvinenko (LDPR), Member of Pskov City Duma (2022–present), former Member of Pskov Oblast Assembly of Deputies (2016–2021)
 Andrey Makovsky (New People), Member of Pskov Oblast Assembly of Deputies (2021–present)
 Anton Minakov (LDPR), Member of Pskov Oblast Assembly of Deputies (2011–present), 2018 gubernatorial candidate
 Aleksandr Nozhka (CPRF), Member of Pskovsky District Assembly of Deputies (2017–present)
 Artyom Vasilyev (LDPR), LDPR regional office deputy coordinator

Declined
 Pyotr Alekseyenko (CPRF), Member of Pskov Oblast Assembly of Deputies (2016–present)
 Nikolai Bondarenko (CPRF), former Member of Saratov Oblast Duma (2017–2022)
 Dmitry Mikhaylov (CPRF), Member of Pskov Oblast Assembly of Deputies (2011–2016, 2018–present), aide to State Duma First Deputy Speaker Ivan Melnikov (2017–present)
 Arkady Murylyov (CPRF), Pskov Oblast Commissioner for Entrepreneurs' Rights (2015–present), 2018 gubernatorial candidate
 Lev Shlosberg (Yabloko), former Member of Pskov Oblast Assembly of Deputies (2011–2015, 2016–2021), 2014 gubernatorial candidate
 Anastasia Udaltsova (CPRF), Member of State Duma (2022–present)

See also
2023 Russian regional elections

References

Pskov Oblast
Pskov Oblast
Politics of Pskov Oblast